Lucas Heights is one of the northernmost suburbs of the contiguous Auckland metropolitan area in New Zealand. It is on the North Shore, directly west of Albany, and is located in the Albany ward for local government purposes.

History 
The eastern boundary of the suburb is formed by Lucas Creek, which has been known as such since 1840. The name is thought to come from a settler named Lucas whose land extended to the edge of the creek.

References 

Suburbs of Auckland
North Shore, New Zealand